The 1998 WDF Europe Cup was the 11th edition of the WDF Europe Cup darts tournament, organised by the World Darts Federation. It was held in Oslo, Norway from 6 to 9 August.



Entered teams

26 countries/associations entered a men's selection in the event.

21 countries/associations entered a womans's selection in the event.

Men's singles

Men's Pairs

Men's team
Round Robin 

Group A

 England 9 - 7  Denmark
 England 9 - 7  Finland
 England 9 - 0  Greece
 Denmark 9 - 7  Finland
 Denmark 9 - 1  Greece
 Finland 9 - 3  Greece

Group B

 Sweden 9 - 5  Malta  
 Sweden 9 - 3  Italy  
 Malta 9 - 4  Italy

Group C

 Scotland 9 - 1  Iceland 
 Scotland 9 - 0  Faroe Islands         
 Iceland 9 - 2  Faroe Islands

Group D

 Wales 9 - 3  Switzerland
 Wales 9 - 0  Czech Republic  
 Switzerland 9 - 3  Czech Republic

Group E

 Netherlands 9 - 3  Hungary
 Netherlands 9 - 4  Austria
 Hungary 9 - 4  Austria

Group F

 Germany 9 - 1  Norway
 Germany 9 - 1  Latvia 
 Norway 9 - 3  Latvia

Group G

 Belgium 9 - 0  Gibraltar 
 Belgium 9 - 2  Cyprus 
 Gibraltar 9 - 2  Cyprus

Group H

 Northern Ireland 9 - 4  Ireland
 Northern Ireland 9 - 4  France
 Northern Ireland 9 - 2  Isle of Man
 Ireland 9 - 5  France
 Ireland 9 - 2  Isle of Man
 France 9 - 8  Isle of Man

Knock Out

Woman's singles

Woman's Pairs
Round Robin 

Group A

 Mandy Solomons & Trina Gulliver 4 - 1  Ann-Louise Peters & Annette Hakonsen
 Mandy Solomons & Trina Gulliver 4 - 3  Bianka Strauch & Heike Ernst
 Mandy Solomons & Trina Gulliver 4 - 0  Linda Jordon & Jackie Sayle
 Mandy Solomons & Trina Gulliver 4 - 1  Mette Engen-Hansen & Tove Vestrum
 Mandy Solomons & Trina Gulliver 4 - 1  Laura Aboltina & Sunny Field
 Ann-Louise Peters & Annette Hakonsen 4 - 0  Bianka Strauch & Heike Ernst
 Ann-Louise Peters & Annette Hakonsen 4 - 1  Linda Jordon & Jackie Sayle
 Ann-Louise Peters & Annette Hakonsen 4 - 3  Mette Engen-Hansen & Tove Vestrum
 Ann-Louise Peters & Annette Hakonsen 4 - 2  Laura Aboltina & Sunny Field
 Bianka Strauch & Heike Ernst 4 - 1  Linda Jordon & Jackie Sayle
 Bianka Strauch & Heike Ernst 4 - 1  Mette Engen-Hansen & Tove Vestrum
 Bianka Strauch & Heike Ernst 4 - 0  Laura Aboltina & Sunny Field
 Linda Jordon & Jackie Sayle 4 - 1  Mette Engen-Hansen & Tove Vestrum
 Linda Jordon & Jackie Sayle 4 - 1  Laura Aboltina & Sunny Field
 Mette Engen-Hansen & Tove Vestrum 4 - 1  Laura Aboltina & Sunny Field
Group B

 Denise Cassidy & Grace Crane 4 - 1  Linda Nilsson & Kristina Korpii
 Denise Cassidy & Grace Crane 4 - 1  Kveta Drahuska & Vladimira Dudkova
 Denise Cassidy & Grace Crane 4 - 1  Loredana Brumetz & Carla Constantini
 Denise Cassidy & Grace Crane 4 - 1  Sue Parody & Sue Vinent
 Linda Nilsson & Kristina Korpii 4 - 1  Kveta Drahuska & Vladimira Dudkova
 Linda Nilsson & Kristina Korpii 4 - 0  Loredana Brumetz & Carla Constantini
 Linda Nilsson & Kristina Korpii 4 - 0  Sue Parody & Sue Vinent
 Kveta Drahuska & Vladimira Dudkova 4 - 3  Loredana Brumetz & Carla Constantini
 Kveta Drahuska & Vladimira Dudkova 4 - 1  Sue Parody & Sue Vinent
 Loredana Brumetz & Carla Constantini 4 - 3  Sue Parody & Sue Vinent

Group C

 Anne Kirk & Donna Robertson 4 - 0  Lisa Huber & Corrine Wittwer 
 Anne Kirk & Donna Robertson 4 - 2  Mieke de Boer & Valerie Maytum  
 Anne Kirk & Donna Robertson 4 - 0  Timea Dobos & Ibolya Pentek    
 Anne Kirk & Donna Robertson 4 - 2  Alexia Demetriou & Teresa Mills  
 Lisa Huber & Corrine Wittwer 4 - 2  Mieke de Boer & Valerie Maytum  
 Lisa Huber & Corrine Wittwer 4 - 2  Timea Dobos & Ibolya Pentek   
 Lisa Huber & Corrine Wittwer 4 - 3  Alexia Demetriou & Teresa Mills
 Mieke de Boer & Valerie Maytum 4 - 0  Timea Dobos & Ibolya Pentek  
 Mieke de Boer & Valerie Maytum 4 - 0  Alexia Demetriou & Teresa Mills   
 Timea Dobos & Ibolya Pentek 4 - 0  Alexia Demetriou & Teresa Mills
Group D

 Sandra Greatbatch & Gaynor Williams 4 - 0  Heli Ohvavainen & Tarja Salminen
 Sandra Greatbatch & Gaynor Williams 4 - 0  Virginie Vinet & Isabelle Caron 
 Sandra Greatbatch & Gaynor Williams 4 - 0  Gabrielle Klem & Michaela Blahaus 
 Marion McDermott & Maureen Kelly 4 - 2  Sandra Greatbatch & Gaynor Williams
 Marion McDermott & Maureen Kelly 4 - 1  Virginie Vinet & Isabelle Caron 
 Marion McDermott & Maureen Kelly 4 - 0  Gabrielle Klem & Michaela Blahaus
 Heli Ohvavainen & Tarja Salminen 4 - 3  Marion McDermott & Maureen Kelly
 Heli Ohvavainen & Tarja Salminen 4 - 1  Virginie Vinet & Isabelle Caron
 Heli Ohvavainen & Tarja Salminen 4 - 0  Gabrielle Klem & Michaela Blahaus   
 Virginie Vinet & Isabelle Caron 4 - 2  Gabrielle Klem & Michaela Blahaus

Knock Out

References

Darts tournaments